Wallisellen is a railway station in Switzerland, in the municipality of Wallisellen. It is located on the Zurich to Winterthur railway line, and is to the Zurich side of the junction with the Wallisellen to Rapperswil via Uster line.

The railway station is adjacent to the newly built Richti Shopping development.

Service 
The station is an interchange point between the Zurich S-Bahn and the Stadtbahn Glattal light rail system. It is served by Zürich tram route 12, operating on behalf of the Stadtbahn Glattal, and by S-Bahn lines S8, S14 and S19. On weekends, there is also a nighttime S-Bahn services (SN8) offered by ZVV.

Wallisellen is served by four mainline tracks, numbered 3 through 6 (1 and 2 correspond to the Stadtbahn Glattal), accessed by two island platforms. Track 3 is used by eastbound trains to Effretikon and Hinwil, and track 4 by westbound trains to Zürich and beyond. Tracks 5 and 6 are not currently used in scheduled service.

Summary of S-Bahn services:

 Zürich S-Bahn:
 Nighttime S-Bahn (only during weekends):

Gallery

References

External links 

Wallisellen railway station on the Swiss Federal Railways' web site

Railway stations in the canton of Zürich
Swiss Federal Railways stations